The Jit Gadhi (historically known as Butwal Gadhi) is a fort in Butwal, Lumbini Province, Nepal.

The Jit Gadhi was built by the Sen dynasty.

This fort was used during the Anglo-Nepalese War (1814–1816) where Colonel Ujir Singh Thapa led Nepal's victory in the Battle of Jitgadhi against the East India Company.

In 2019, the Butwal Sub-Metropolitan City revealed the life-size statue of Ujir Singh Thapa.

In 2021, near the Jit Gadhi is currently being built a war museum to commemorate the Battle of Jitgadhi.

References

Further reading 

 
 

Forts in Nepal
History of Nepal
Buildings and structures in Rupandehi District